The following is an alphabetical list of topics related to the Republic of Indonesia.

0–9
 .id
 127/U/Kep/12/1966
 2002 Bali bombings
 2004 Indian Ocean earthquake and tsunami
 2005 Bali bombings
 2005 Java-Bali blackout
 2005 Malaysian haze
 2005 Nias–Simeulue earthquake
 2007 in Indonesia
 2007 Jakarta flood
 2009 Sumatra earthquakes (Padang)
 3G (countries)

A 
 Abangan
 Abdul Aziz Imam Samudra
 Abdul Haris Nasution
 Abdul Latief
 Abdul Muis
 Abdul Rahman Saleh (hero)
 Abdul Rahman Saleh (prosecutor)
 Abdullah Sungkar
 Abdurrahman Wahid
 Abinomn language
 Abraham van Riebeeck
 Abu Bakar Bashir
 Aburizal Bakrie
 Aceh Besar Regency, Jantho
 Aceh Jaya Regency
 Aceh
 Acehnese people
 Act of Free Choice
 Adam Air Flight 172
 Adam Air Flight 574
 Adam Malik
 Adat
 Adinegoro Award
 Adityawarman
 Administrative divisions of Indonesia
 Adonara
 Adrian Zecha
 Agama Hindu Dharma
 Aghu language
 Agnes Monica
 Agung Laksono
 Agus R. Sarjono
 Agus Salim
 Agus Wirahadikusumah
 Ahmad Dahlan
 Ahmad Dhani
 Ahmad Khatib
 Ahmad Suradji
 Airlangga
 Airoran
 Akbar Tanjung
 Alaban
 Alan Budikusuma
 Alas Purwo National Park
 Albert Aalbers
 Alfuros
 Ali Alatas
 Alor Archipelago
 Alor
 Alor Strait
 Alvent Yulianto
 Alvin Lie
 Alwi Shihab
 Amangkurat I of Mataram
 Amangkurat II of Mataram
 Ambon Island
 Ambonese
 Amboyna massacre
 Amelia Natasha
 Ameta
 Amien Rais
 Amir Sjarifuddin
 Amrozi bin Nurhasyim
 Amung language
 Amung people
 Anambas
 Ananda Mikola
 Ananda Sukarlan
 Angelique Widjaja
 Anggun Nugroho
 Anggun
 Angke
 Anglo-Dutch Treaty of 1814
 Anglo-Dutch Treaty of 1824
 Antaboga
 ANTARA
 Anthony van Diemen
 Anti-Chinese legislation in Indonesia
 Anton Apriantono
 Anton Medan
 Anus language
 Anusapati
 APEC
 APEKSI
 Arbir
 Ardy B. Wiranata
 Arema Malang
 Arfak Mountains
 Arief Budiman
 Arisan!
 Arnhemia
 Aru Islands
 Aru
 Arun, Sumatra
 ASEAN
 Asian-African Conference
 Asmat people
 Asmat Swamp
 Astrid Susanto
 Atambua
 Ateng Wahyudi
 Atika Suri
 Attack on Broome
 Attap dwelling
 Australia-Indonesia Prisoner Transfer Agreement
 Australia-Indonesia relations
 Auw Jong Peng Koen
 Ayu Utami

B 
 Babar Island
 Bacan
 Badan Intelijen Negara
 Nuclear Energy Regulatory Agency (BAPETEN)
 Badui
 Badung Strait
 Bagansiapiapi
 Baginda Seri Sultana Zinatudin Kemalat Shah
 Bajau
 Bakti Negara
 Bakauheni
 Bali Barat National Park
 Bali
 Balinese caste system
 Balinese language
 Balinese mythology
 Balinese people
 Baluran
 Mt Baluran
 Bambang Pamungkas
 Banda Aceh
 Banda Islands
 Banda Sea
 Bandanaira
 Bandar Lampung
 Bandung High Tech Valley
 Bandung Regency
 Bandung Sea of Fire (1946)
 Bandung Station
 Banggai Islands Regency
 Banggai Regency
 Bangka Island
 Bangka Regency
 Bangka-Belitung Islands
 Bangkalan
 Bangsawan
 Banjar baru
 Banjar language
 Banjar people
 Banjar, West Java
 Bantam (city)
 Banten
 Bantenese language
 Bantenese people
 Bantik language
 Banyak Islands
 Banyumasan language
 Banyusumurup
 Bapak
 Barabai
 Barat Daya Islands
 Baris (dance)
 Barisan Mountains
 Barito River
 Barong (mythology)
 Barry Prima
 Batak (Indonesia)
 Batam
 Batang Hari River
 Batara Kala
 Batik
 Battle of Ambon
 Battle of Badung Strait
 Battle of Balikpapan (1945)
 Battle of Makassar Strait
 Battle of Manado
 Battle of Surabaya (1945)
 Battle of Tarakan (1942)
 Battle of Tarakan (1945)
 Battle of the Java Sea
 Batu Islands
 Batusangkar
 Bauzi language
 Bauzi people
 Bawang Putih Bawang Merah
 Bawean
 Bayono–Awbono languages
 Bedhaya
 Bekasi Regency
 Bekasi
 Beleganjur
 Belitung
 Bendahara
 Bengawan Solo (song)
 Bengawan Solo River
 Bengkalis
 Bengkulu City
 Bengkulu
 Benteng Mania
 Benteng Stadium
 Berastagi
 Betawi people
 Bethesda Hospital Yogyakarta
 Bhinneka Tunggal Ika
 Biak
 Bill against Pornography and Pornoaction
 Bina Swadaya
 Bintan
 Bintang Di Surga
 Binus University
 Bird's Head Peninsula
 Bireuen
 Bisj Pole
 Blambangan Peninsula
 Blitar
 Blok M
 Bob Hasan
 Bogor Botanical Gardens
 Bogor Regency
 Bojonegoro
 Bolaang Mongondow language
 Bomoh
 Bona Sijabat
 Surabaya Zoo
 Bondowoso
 Bone state
 Borneo campaign (1945)
 Borneo
 Borobudur
 Brawijaya Stadium
 BRIC
 Gegana
 Broery
 Bubungan Tinggi
 Buddhism in Indonesia
 Budi Putra
 Budiman Sudjatmiko
 Bugis
 Bujangga Manik
 Bukit Barisan Selatan National Park
 Bukit Lawang
 Bukit Peninsula
 Bukittinggi
 Buletin Malam
 Buletin Siang
 Bulu Rantekombola
 Bulu Rantemario
 Bulungan
 Bunak
 Bunaken
 Bung Karno Stadium
 Bunguran
 Bunyu
 Burmeso language
 Buru
 Buton
 Buyat Bay

C 
 Cakung
 Calang
 Calon Bantara
 Candi Kalasan
 Candi Muara Takus
 Candi of Indonesia
 Candi Sukuh
 Candi Surawana
 Candra Wijaya
 Cape Selatan
 Catholicism in Indonesia
 Celempungan
 Cempaka Putih
 Cenderawasih Bay
 Cengkareng
 Central Jakarta
 Central Java
 Central Kalimantan
 Central Sulawesi
 Ceram Sea
 Chairil Anwar
 Chandra Wijaya
 Chandrabhanu
 Chinese Indonesian
 Chris John (boxer)
 Christian Hadinata
 Christianity in Indonesia
 Christianto Wibisono
 Christine Hakim
 Chrisye
 Ciamis Regency
 Ciamis
 Cianjur Regency
 Cianjur
 Cibinong
 Cibiru
 Cibodas Botanical Gardens
 Cicurug
 Cijeruk
 Cilacap Station
 Cilandak
 Cilegon
 Ciliwung River
 Cimahi
 Cinema of Indonesia
 Cinere
 Cipatujah
 Cipayung
 Ciracas
 Cirebon Regency
 Cirebonese
 Bandung Ciroyom Station
 Citak language
 Cities and regencies of Indonesia
 CIVETS
 Coat of arms of Indonesia
 Communications in Indonesia
 Confederation of All Indonesian Workers' Union
 Confederation of Indonesia Prosperous Trade Union
 Confucianism in Indonesia
 Constitution of Indonesia
 Constitutional Assembly of Indonesia
 Cornelis de Houtman
 Corruption Eradication Commission
 Countries affected by the 2004 Indian Ocean earthquake
 COVID-19 pandemic in Indonesia
 Cultivation System
 Culture of Indonesia

D 
 Da'i Bachtiar
 Dada Rosada
 Dago, Indonesia
 Dangdut
 Dani people
 Daniel Mananta
 Dayak people
 Deddy Mizwar
 Delta Putra Sidoarjo
 Demak
 Demographics of Indonesia
 Denjaka
 Denny Kantono
 Denny Sumargo
 Denpasar
 Depok
 Derawan Islands
 Desi Anwar
 Detachment 88
 Detasemen Bravo
 Dewa Budjana
 Dewa Made Beratha
 Dewi Shri
 Dharmasraya Regency
 Dharmawangsa
 Dian Sastrowardoyo
 Dick Sudirman
 Didi Petet
 Dieng Plateau
 Differences between Malay and Indonesian
 Digul River
 Dili massacre
 Dina Astita
 Dipa Nusantara Aidit
 Diponegoro
 Djoko Suyanto
 Dondang Sayang
 Donggala Regency
 Dorce Gamalama
 Dreamland Beach
 Dumai
 Duren Sawit, Duren Sawit
 Duren Sawit
 Duri Kepa
 Dutch East India Company
 Dutch East Indies
 Dutch Ethical Policy and Indonesian National Revival

E 
 East Bird's Head languages
 East Bird's Head – Sentani languages
 East Cengkareng
 East Geelvink Bay languages
 East Jakarta
 East Java
 East Kalimantan
 East Nusa Tenggara
 East Peninsula, Sulawesi
 Ebiet G. Ade
 Ebulobo
 Mt Ebulobo
 Economy of Indonesia*
 Eddy Hartono
 Education in Indonesia
 Effect of the 2004 Indian Ocean earthquake on Indonesia
 Eko Yuli Irawan
 Elections in Indonesia
 Ellyas Pical
 Elseng language
 Elvy Sukaesih
 Embassy of Indonesia in Ottawa
 Emergency Government of the Republic of Indonesia (PDRI)
 Emil Salim
 Ende Regency
 Ende, Indonesia
 Endemic birds of Indonesia
 Energy in Indonesia
 Eng Hian
 Enggano Island
 Eny Widiowati
 Evan Sanders
 Evie Tamala
 Extended West Papuan
 Extravaganza (TV series)

F 
 Fahri Asiza
 Fauna of Indonesia
 Federasi Serikat Petani Indonesia
 Fira Basuki
 Flag of Indonesia
 Flandy Limpele
 Flora of Indonesia
 Flores Sea
 Flores
 Fly River
 Foja Mountains
 Football Association of Indonesia
 Foreign aid to Indonesia
 Foreign relations of Indonesia
 Frans Tutuhatunewa
 Free Aceh Movement
 Free Papua Movement
 Freeport-McMoRan
 Fung Permadi

G 
 G-20 major economies
 G-Land
 E-7 (Emerging 7)
 Gajah Mada
 Gajahmada Mojosari Stadium
 Gajayana Stadium
 Galang Island
 Galang Refugee Camp
 Galungan
 Mt Galunggung
 Gambir Station
 Gambir (Jakarta)
 Gambir, Jakarta
 Gamelan jegog
 Gamelan joged bumbung
 Garuda Indonesia Flight 152
 Garuda Indonesia Flight 200
 Garuda Wisnu Kencana
 Garut Regency
 Garut
 Subroto
 Gayo language
 Gayo people
 Gedong Kirtya
 Gelora 10 November Stadium
 Gelora Delta Stadium
 Gelora Joko Samudro Stadium
 Gelora Kieraha Stadium
 Geography of Indonesia
 Geothermal power in Indonesia
 Gerakan Pramuka
 Gerwani
 Gesang Martohartono
 Gie
 Gili Air
 Gili Islands
 Gili Meno
 Gili Motang
 Gili Trawangan
 Ginandjar Kartasasmita
 Giri Tunggal Heroes' Cemetery
 Giriloyo
 Girimulya Surakarta
 Gita Gutawa
 Gleebruk
 Glodok
 Godert van der Capellen
 Goenawan Mohamad
 Gorontalo (city)
 Gorontalo
 Gorontalo Regency
 Government Administration in Indonesia
 Governor-General of the Dutch East Indies
 Grasberg mine
 Great Timor
 Greater Sunda Islands
 Gresik United
 Grogol Petamburan
 Grogol
 Gugum Gumbira
 Gulf of Tomini
 Gunadharma
 Gunung Karang
 Gunung Leuser National Park
 Gunung Palung National Park
 Gunungsitoli
 Gustaaf Willem baron van Imhoff

H 
 H. S. Dillon
 Hainuwele
 Haji Agus Salim Stadium
 Halmahera
 Hamengkubuwana I
 Hamengkubuwana II
 Hamengkubuwana III
 Hamengkubuwana IV
 Hamengkubuwana IX
 Hamengkubuwana V
 Hamengkubuwana VI
 Hamengkubuwana VII
 Hamengkubuwana VIII
 Hamengkubuwana X
 Hamengkubuwono X
 Hamka
 Hamzah Fansuri
 Hamzah Haz
 Hang Jebat
 Hang Nadim
 Hang Tuah
 Hari Raya Aidilfitri
 Hari Raya
 Hariyanto Arbi
 Hassan Wirajuda
 Hastomo Arbi
 Hayam Wuruk
 Helmi Johannes
 Hendrawan
 Hendrik Brouwer
 Hendrik Merkus de Kock
 Henk Sneevliet
 Herman Johannes
 Herman Willem Daendels
 Hermawan Susanto
 Hidayat Nur Wahid
 Hidayatullah
 Hikayat Banjar
 Hikayat Bayan Budiman
 Hikayat Hang Tuah
 Hindu Revival in Indonesia
 Hinduism in Indonesia
 Hinduism in Java
 Hinduism in Sulawesi
 History of Indonesia
 Homelessness in Indonesia
 Hotman Paris Hutapea
 HR Dharsono
 Human rights in Indonesia
 Humanitarian response to the 2004 Indian Ocean earthquake

I 
 I Ching (monk)
 Icuk Sugiarto
 Ida Bagus Wiswantanu
 Ijen
 Mt Ijen
 Iliboleng
 Mt Iliboleng
 Iie Sumirat
 Ililabalekan
 Mt Ililabalekan
 Ilimuda
 Mt Ilimuda
 Iliwerung
 Mt Iliwerung
 Imogiri
 Indian Indonesian
 Indo people
 Indonesia at the 1972 Summer Olympics
 Indonesia at the 1976 Summer Olympics
 Indonesia at the 1984 Summer Olympics
 Indonesia at the 1988 Summer Olympics
 Indonesia at the 1992 Summer Olympics
 Indonesia at the 1996 Summer Olympics
 Indonesia at the 2000 Summer Olympics
 Indonesia at the 2004 Summer Olympics
 Indonesia national football team
 Indonesia national football team records and statistics
 Indonesia Open
 Indonesia Raya
 Indonesia Seven Summits Expedition
 Indonesia Stock Exchange
 Indonesia Today
 Indonesia-Malaysia confrontation
 Indonesia Without Discrimination Movement
 Indonesia
 Indonesian architecture
 Indonesian calendars
 Indonesian car number plates
 Indonesian car
 Indonesian coffee
 Indonesian communist exiles in Tirana
 Indonesian Declaration of Independence
 Indonesian Film Festival
 Indonesian Future Leaders
 Indonesian hip hop
 Indonesian Idol
 Indonesian invasion of East Timor
 Indonesian language
 2004 Indonesian legislative election
 2009 Indonesian legislative election
 2014 Indonesian legislative election
 Indonesian literature
 Indonesian literature in the period 1950–65
 Indonesian Masters
 Indonesian Medical Olympiad
 Indonesia Mencari Bakat (season 3)
 Indonesian military ranks
 Indonesian monarchies
 Indonesian names
 Indonesian National Revolution
 Indonesian new art movement
 Indonesia Now
 Indonesian children in Australian prisons
 Indonesian philosophy
 2004 Indonesian presidential election
 2009 Indonesian presidential election
 2014 Indonesian presidential election
 Indonesian Railways Workers' Union
 Indonesian Revolution of 1998
 Indonesian rupiah
 Indonesian slang language
 Indonesian Television Journalists Association
 Indonesian Trade Union Confederation
 Indonesian-sounding names adopted by Chinese Indonesians
 Indonesian-Ukrainian dictionary
 Indonesian Village Law
 Indosat
 Indra Lesmana
 Indramayu Regency
 Indramayu
 Indy Barends
 Inielika
 Mt Inielika
 Inierie
 Mt Inielika
 International rankings of Indonesia
 Internet in Indonesia
 Inul Daratista
 Invasion of Java (1811)
 Ishak Effendi
 Isidore van Kinsbergen
 Isirawa language
 Islam in Indonesia
 Islands of Indonesia
 ISO 3166-2:ID
 Istana Bogor
 Istana Luwu
 Istana Maimun
 Istana Merdeka
 Istana Negara, Jakarta
 Istana Wakil Presiden
 Istana
 Istiqlal Mosque, Jakarta
 Isyana Dynasty
 Ita Martadinata Haryono
 ITC Roxy Mas
 Iwan Fals
 Iya (volcano)

J 
 J. B. van Heutsz
 Jabodetabek
 Jabotabek
 Jack van Tongeren
 Jaffna Kingdom
 Jagorawi Toll Road
 Jakabaring Stadium
 Jakarta Bay
 Jakarta Cathedral
 Jakarta Convention Center
 Jakarta International Film Festival
 Jakarta Kota Station
 Kota (Jakarta)
 Jakarta Monorail
 Jakarta Riots of May 1998
 Jakarta Tower
 Jakarta
 Jalan Jaksa
 Jalan Malioboro
 Jalek Harupat Soreang Stadium
 Jalembar Baru
 Jalembar
 Jambi (city)
 Jambi
 James Riady
 Jan Pieterszoon Coen
 Janggala
 Japanese occupation of the Dutch East Indies
 Jatidiri Stadium
 Jatinegara (Jakarta)
 Jatinegara
 Jatipulo
 Java Australian Football League
 Java Sea
 Java War
 Java
 Javanese beliefs
 Javanese historical texts
 Javanese language
 Javanese people
 Javanese poetry
 Javanese sacred places
 Jaya Suprana
 Jayapura Bay languages
 Jayapura
 Jayawijaya Mountains
 Jembatan Besi
 Jembatan Lima
 Jember
 Jenderal Besar
 Jenglot
 Jepara
 Jeruk Purut Cemetery
 Jewish-Indonesian
 Jimbaran
 Jo Novita
 Joan Maetsuycker
 Joged
 Joglo
 Johannes Camphuys
 Johannes van den Bosch
 Johar Baru
 John Juanda
 Jojon
 Joko Anwar
 Joko Suprianto
 Jombang Regency
 Joni's Promise
 Joy Destiny Tobing
 Joyoboyo
 Julius Riyadi Darmaatmadja
 2006 Pangandaran earthquake and tsunami
 Jusuf Habibie
 Jusuf Kalla
 Juwono Sudarsono

K 
 Kaba (volcano)
 Mt Kaba
 Kabanjahe
 Kaharingan
 Kahitna
 Kai Islands
 Kakaban
 Kakawin Bharatayuddha
 Kakawin Hariwangsa
 Kakawin
 Kali Anyar
 Kalibata Heroes Cemetery
 Kalideres, Kalideres
 Kalideres
 Kalimantan
 Kaliurang
 Kamal Djunaedi Stadium
 Kamal, Kalideres
 Kamaruzaman Sjam
 Asep Kambali
 Kambangan Island
 Kambera language
 Kamojang geothermal field
 Kampong
 Kangean Islands
 Kanjuruhan Stadium
 Kapuas Hulu
 Kapuas River
 Kapuk
 Karangetang
 Mt Karangetang
 Karawaci, Tangerang
 Karawang Regency
 Karawang
 Karet Bivak Cemetery
 Karimata islands
 Karimata Strait
 Karimun
 Karo people
 Karo Regency
 Kata Kolok
 Kayan Mentarang National Park
 Keagungan
 Kebaya
 Kebon Jeruk, Kebon Jeruk
 Kebon Jeruk
 Kecak
 Kedaung Kali Angke
 Kediri kingdom
 Kediri
 Kedukan Bukit Inscription
 Cirebon Kejaksan Station
 Kekal
 Kelapa Dua
 Kelimutu
 Mt Kelimutu
 Kelong
 Kelut
 Mt Kelut
 Kemak people
 Kemal Idris
 Kemanggisan
 Kemayoran
 Kembangan, Jakarta
 Kemusuk
 Ken Arok
 Ken Dedes
 Kendari
 Kendayan
 Kerinci Seblat National Park
 Keriu language
 Kertarajasa
 Kertok
 Bandung Kiaracondong Station
 Kidung Sunda
 Kidzania
 Kingdom of Mataram
 Kingdoms of Sunda (1st century – 1600)
 Kintamani (dog)
 Kisar
 Kombai people
 Komodo (island)
 Komodo National Park
 KOMTEVE
 Kopaja
 KOPASKA
 Kopassus
 Korintus Koliopas Fingkreuw
 Korowai language
 Korowai people
 Korps Marinir
 Korps Speciale Troepen
 Kosambi, Jakarta
 Kostrad
 Kotamadya
 KPK
 Krakatoa
 Mt Krakatao
 Kretek
 KRI Dewaruci
 KRI Wilhelmus Zakarias Yohannes
 Krio Dayak language
 Krio Dayak people
 Krio River
 Krisdayanti
 Kristiani Herrawati
 Kroncong
 Kulintang
 Kuningan
 Kuntao
 Kurniawan Dwi Yulianto
 Kusumanegara Heroes' Cemetery
 Kuta
 Kwik Kian Gie
 Kyai

L 
 Lagaligo Stadium
 Lagundri Bay
 Lake Diatas
 Lake Dibawah
 Lake Gunung Tujuh
 Lake Kerinci
 Lake Laut Tawar
 Lake Maninjau
 Lake Matano
 Lake Poso
 Lake Ranau
 Lake Singkarak
 Lake Tempe
 Lake Toba
 Lake Towuti
 Laksamana
 Lampung
 Lanfang Republic
 Lang Island
 Langgam jawa
 Languages of Indonesia
 Lani (ethnic group)
 Law enforcement in Indonesia
 Law of Indonesia
 Lawa River (Indonesia)
 Lebak Bulus Stadium
 Lebak Bulus
 Legend of Gunung Ledang
 Legian
 Indonesian Institute of Islamic Dawah (LDII)
 Lembaga Musyawarah Adat Asmat
 Lembata
 Lempuyangan Station (Yogyakarta)
 Mt Leroboleng
 Lesser Sunda Islands
 Leti Island
 Mt Lewotobi
 Mt Lewotolo
 Leyak
 LGBT rights in Indonesia (Gay rights)
 Liang Bua Cave
 Liang Dao Ming
 Liem Swie King
 Liga Indonesia
 Liliyana Natsir
 Lindu
 Lingga Islands
 Linggadjati Agreement
 Linton Sirait
 Lion Air Flight 583
 Lippo Karawaci
 Liran
 List of airlines of Indonesia
 List of airports in Indonesia
 List of Ambassadors from New Zealand to Indonesia
 List of banks in Indonesia
 List of Biosphere Reserves in Indonesia
 Chinese Indonesians
 List of cities in Indonesia including population statistics
 Cities in Indonesia
 List of colonial buildings and structures in Jakarta
 List of companies of Indonesia
 List of earthquakes in Indonesia
 List of famous Indonesian Chinese
 List of football clubs in Indonesia
 Football clubs in Indonesia
 List of Governors of Jakarta
 Governors of Yogyakarta
 List of Hikayat
 Indonesian acronyms and abbreviations
 List of Indonesian agricultural universities and colleges
 List of Indonesian Ambassadors to Australia
 List of Indonesian Ambassadors to the United Kingdom
 List of Indonesian birds: non-passerines
 List of Indonesian birds: passerines
 List of Indonesian birds
 List of Indonesian composers
 List of Indonesian dishes
 List of Indonesian language poets
 Indonesian musicians
 List of Indonesian painters
 List of Indonesian ports
 List of Indonesian provinces by GRP per capita
 List of Indonesian provinces by HDI
 List of Indonesian provinces by highest point
 Indonesian people
 List of Jakarta Subdistricts
 List of lakes in Indonesia
 List of main infrastructure projects in Indonesia
 Main infrastructure projects in Indonesia
 List of museums and cultural institutions in Indonesia
 List of National Heroes of Indonesia
 List of national parks of Indonesia
 National parks of Indonesia
 List of natural disasters in Indonesia
 Natural disasters in Indonesia
 List of newspapers in Indonesia
 Newspapers in Indonesia
 People on stamps of Indonesia
 List of political parties in Indonesia
 List of power stations in Indonesia
 List of presidents of Indonesia
 Presidents of Indonesia
 List of prime ministers of Indonesia
 Prime Ministers of Indonesia
 List of radio stations in Banda Aceh, Indonesia
 List of radio stations in Bandung, Indonesia
 List of radio stations in Jakarta
 Radio stations in Jakarta
 List of radio stations in Pekanbaru
 List of regencies and cities of Indonesia
 List of Roman Catholic dioceses in Indonesia
 Sacred Places in Java
 List of television stations in Indonesia
 List of terrorist incidents in Indonesia
 List of universities in East Java
 List of universities in Indonesia
 List of vice presidents of Indonesia
 Vice Presidents of Indonesia
 List of volcanoes in Indonesia
 List of World Heritage Sites in Indonesia
 Lita Nurlita
 Lius Pongoh
 Loan words in Indonesian
 Lombok Strait
 Lombok
 Lombok Times
 Long Road to Heaven
 Longhouse
 Lore Lindu National Park
 Lorentz National Park
 Lower Mamberamo languages
 Luluk Hadiyanto

M 
 M. H. Lukman
 M. Nasroen
 M/V Senopati Nusantara
 Madura Island
 Madurese language
 Madurese people
 Maesa Stadium
 Mahakam River
 Majapahit
 Makam Mahsuri
 Makassar language
 Makassar Strait
 Malang Station
 Malay ghost myths
 Malay houses
 Malay Ruler
 Malay titles
 Malays (ethnic group)
 Malik ul Salih
 Malin Kundang
 Maluku (Indonesian province)
 Maluku Islands
 Spice Islands
 Mamberamo River
 Manado Malay
 Manahan Stadium
 Manananggal
 Mandala Airlines Flight 091
 Mandala Krida Stadium
 Mandala Stadium
 Mandra
 Mangole Island
 Mangunwijaya
 Manuel Carrascalão
 Manusela
 Maphilindo
 Marapu
 March 2007 Sumatra earthquakes
 Mari Elka Pangestu
 Maria Dermoût
 Mariana Renata
 Markis Kido
 Mataram Kingdom
 Mataram Sultanate
 Mattoangin Stadium
 2006 Yogyakarta earthquake (Bantul)
 Media of Indonesia
 Megawati Sukarnoputri
 Melayu Kingdom
 Mentawai Islands
 Mentawai language
 Mentawai people
 Mentawai Strait
 Menteng Stadium
 Merdeka
 Metro Pagi
 MetroMini, Jakarta
 Meuthia Kasim
 Mia Audina Tjiptawan
 Mike Mohede
 Military of Indonesia
 Minahasa
 Minangkabau language
 Minangkabau
 Ming Shi-lu
 Mobile8
 Moerdani
 Mohammad Hatta
 Mohammad Toha
 Monumen Nasional
 Moreno Suprapto
 Morotai
 Mother Temple of Besakih
 Mt Agung
 Mt Batur
 Mt Bromo
 Mt Ceremei
 Mt Egon
 Mt Guntur
 Mount Halimun Salak National Park
 Mt Hiri
 Mt Iya
 Mt Kerinci
 Mt Leuser
 Mt Marapi
 Mt Merapi
 Mt Merbabu
 Mt Mutis
 Mt Rantekombola
 Mt Rantemario
 Mt Rinjani
 Mt Sago
 Mt Sahandaruman
 Mt Salak
 Mt Singgalang
 Mt Sirung
 Mt Sundoro
 Mt Talakmau
 Mt Talang
 Mt Tambora
 Mt Tandikat
 Mpu Gandring
 Mpu Prapanca
 Mpu Sindok
 Muhammad Natsir
 Muhammad Rachman
 Muhammad Subuh Sumohadiwidjojo
 Muhammadiyah
 Mulan Jameela
 Mulawarman Stadium
 Muna Island
 Munir Said Thalib
 Muntilan
 Musi River (Indonesia)
 Music of Bali
 Music of Indonesia
 Music of Java
 Music of Sumatra
 Musso

N 
 Nabiel Makarim
 Nadine Chandrawinata
 Nagarakretagama
 Natal, Indonesia
 National Institute of Aeronautics and Space
 National Museum of Indonesia
 Natuna Islands
 Nedebang language
 Negara Daha
 Netherlands East Indies campaign
 Netherlands Indian roepiah
 New Guinea
 New Order (Indonesia)
 New York Agreement
 Next Eleven
 Ngurah Rai Stadium
 Nias
 Nico Thomas
 Nidji
 Njoto
 No. 120 (Netherlands East Indies) Squadron RAAF
 No. 18 (Netherlands East Indies) Squadron RAAF
 Noordin Mohammad Top
 Nora Samosir
 North Jakarta
 North Maluku
 North Pagai
 North Sulawesi
 North Sumatra
 Nova Widianto
 Novemthree Siahaan
 Nuansa Pagi
 Nuaulu
 Nuclear power in Indonesia
 Nugroho Wisnumurti
 Nurcholish Madjid
 Nurfitriyana Saiman
 Nusa Dua
 Nusa Penida
 Nyepi
 Nyoman Windha

O 
 Obi Islands
 Obira
 2010 Mentawai earthquake and tsunami (Mentawi earthquake) 
 Oei Tiong Ham
 Oirata
 Omar Dhani
 Ombai Strait
 Ombilin
 Omo sebua
 Once
 Ong Hok Ham
 Operation Garron
 Operation Sumatra Assist
 Operation Unified Assistance
 Orang Bunian
 Orang Laut
 Orang Minyak
 Ortizan Salossa
 Osing
 Overthrow of Sukarno

P 
 Padangbai
 Padri War
 Pagaruyung Kingdom
 Pakubuwana II
 Pakubuwana III
 Pakubuwana IV
 Pakubuwana IX
 Pakubuwana V
 Pakubuwana VI
 Pakubuwana VII
 Pakubuwana VIII
 Pakubuwana X
 Pakubuwana XI
 Pakubuwana XII
 Palapa
 Palu'e language
 Palu'e
 Pancasila (politics)
 Pancasila Indonesia
 Pancoran
 Pandji Tisna
 Panembahan Senopati
 Pangandaran
 Panji Tohjaya
 Pantar
 Panti Rapih Hospital
 Pantun
 Papua (Indonesian province)
 Papuan languages
 Parangtritis
 Pararaton
 Pasai
 Pasar malam
 Pasar pagi
 Pasar Senen (Jakarta)
 Pasar Turi Station (Surabaya)
 Pasaran
 Paspampres
 Pasumpahan
 Pawukon
 Pecatu
 Pegunungan Maoke
 Peleng
 Pelni
 Pendidikan Stadium
 Pendopo
 Penegak Bantara
 Penegak Laksana
 People's Consultative Assembly
 People's Representative Council
 People's Youth
 Peppy
 Peranakan
 Permesta
 Permias
 Persebaya Surabaya
 Persegi Mojokerto
 Persekabpas Pasuruan
 Persela Lamongan
 Persema Malang
 Persib Bandung
 Persiba Balikpapan
 Persiba Stadium
 Persibat Batang
 Persija Jakarta
 Persijap Jepara
 Persik Kediri
 Persikota Tangerang
 Persikota
 Persipura Jayapura
 Persis Solo
 Persita Tangerang
 Persitara Jakarta Utara
 Persiter Ternate
 Persiwa Wamena
 Persmin Minahasa
 Pertamina oil company
 Perusahaan Gas Negara (State Gas Corporation)
 Perusahaan Listrik Negara (State Electricity Corporation)
 Pesantren
 Peterpan (band)
 Pierre Roland
 Pijar
 PK-AFV
 PKT Bontang
 Playboy Indonesia
 Pluit
 PMKRI
 Mt Poco Mandasawu
 Pogar Bangil Stadium
 Politics of Indonesia
 Politionele acties
 Pollycarpus Priyanto
 Pondok Indah Mall
 Pontianak (folklore)
 Poolsche Hoed
 Poorwo Soedarmo
 PP 10/1959
 Prabowo
 Prambanan
 Pramoedya Ananta Toer
 Pramuka Garuda
 Pratiwi Sudarmono
 Princely Highness
 Priyayi
 Prof. Mr. Soenario, S.H.
 Protestants in Indonesia
 Proto Malay
 Provinces of Indonesia
 Cirebon Prujakan Station
 PSBL Bandar Lampung
 PSDS Deli Serdang
 PSIM Yogyakarta
 PSIS Semarang
 PSM Makassar
 PSMS Medan
 PSS Sleman
 PT Kereta Api
 PT Newmont Nusa Tenggara
 Public holidays in Indonesia
 Pulosari (volcano)
 Pulosari, West Java
 Mt Puncak Jaya
 Mt Puncak Mandala
 Mt Puncak Trikora
 Pura Luhur
 Purwodadi Grobogan
 Puspitasari Rina Dewi

Q 
 Qasidah modern

R 
 Rachman Halim
 Raden Ayu Kartini
 Raden Wijaya
 Radius Prawiro
 Raema Lisa Rumbewas
 Ragunan Zoo
 Ragunan Zoo (Jakarta)
 Rail transport in Indonesia
 Rakata
 Rally Indonesia
 Mt Ranakah
 Randai
 Rangda
 Rangga Warsita
 Rasti
 Ratu Adil
 Mt Raung
 Raymond Westerling
 Reformation (Indonesia)
 Regencies of Indonesia
 Regency (Indonesia)
 Regional Representatives Council
 Rejang people
 Religion in Indonesia
 Renville Agreement
 Republic of South Maluku
 Revolutionary Government of the Republic of Indonesia
 Rexy Mainaky
 Rhoma Irama
 Riau Islands
 Riau rupiah
 Riau
 Ricky Subagdja
 Riduan Isamuddin
 Rincah
 Rizal Nurdin
 Roem-van Roijen Agreement
 Mt Rokatenda
 Romang
 Romusha
 Ronggeng
 Rosiana Tendean
 Rossa
 Rote Island
 Royal Netherlands East Indies Army
 Rudy Gunawan
 Rudy Hartono Kurniawan
 Rudy Soedjarwo
 Rumah Gadang
 Run (island)
 Ruslan Abdulgani

S 
 Sabdapalon
 Sailendra
 Sajama cut
 Saluang
 Sam Ratulangi
 Samanhoedi
 Samosir
 Sanana Island
 Sandrina Malakiano
 Sanghyang Siksakanda ng Karesian
 Sangihe Islands
 Sangir
 Sangiran
 Sanjaya Dynasty
 Santri
 Sapardi Djoko Damono
 Saparua
 Sara language (Indonesia)
 Sarekat Islam
 Sari Club
 Sarmi languages
 Sarmi-Jayapura Bay languages
 Sarong
 Sarwendah Kusumawardhani
 Sarwo Edhie Wibowo
 Sasak
 Satuan Karya
 Savu Sea
 Savu
 Schouten Islands
 Seafarers
 Sebuku (Borneo)
 Indonesian cabinet 2009-present
 Selayar Islands
 Selo Soemardjan
 Semaun
 Semen Padang F.C.
 Mt Semeru
 Seminyak
 Sempan language
 Senayan City
 Senggigi
 Sentani language
 Sentul
 Sepak Takraw
 September 2007 Sumatra earthquakes
 Seputar Indonesia
 Seram
 Serdang
 Serua (volcano)
 Setesuyara
 Sheila on 7
 Sherina Munaf
 Siau
 Mt Sibayak
 Siberut National Park
 Siberut
 Sidoarjo mud flow
 Sigit Budiarto
 Sika people
 Silat
 Siliwangi Division
 Siliwangi Stadium
 SilkAir Flight 185
 Simeulue
 Simon Santoso
 Singapore Strait
 Singaraja
 Singhasari
 Singosari
 Sipura
Slank
 Soe Hok Gie
 Solor Archipelago
 Solor
 Songket
 Soni Dwi Kuncoro
 Sophie Masson
 Sosatie
 South East Sulawesi
 South Jakarta
 South Kalimantan
 South Sulawesi
 South Sumatra
 Sport in Indonesia
 Sri Indriyani
 Sri Paku Alam VIII
 Srivijaya
 Sriwijaya F.C.
 SS-1 (rifle)
 Staring-baai
 Stephen Tong
 Strait of Malacca
 Subagio Sastrowardoyo
 Subak (irrigation)
 Subdistricts of Indonesia
 Subud
 Sudharmono
 Sudirman Range
 Sudirman
 Sudono Salim
 Suharto
 Suharyadi Suharyadi
 Sujud Sutrisno
 Sukarno
 Sulawesi
 Sule (comedian)
 Sultanate of Asahan
 Sultanate of Demak
 Sultanate of Johor
 Sultanate of Malacca
 Sultanate of Mataram
 Sultanate of Serdang
 Sumarsam
 Sumatra
 Sumba Strait
 Sumba
 Sumbawa
 Sunaryati Hartono
 Sunda Islands
 Sunda Strait Bridge
 Sunda Strait
 Sundanese language
 Sundanese people
 Sungailiat
 Supersemar
 Surajaya Stadium
 Suramadu Bridge
 Surya Paloh
 Susanto Megaranto
 Susi Susanti
 Susilo Bambang Yudhoyono
 Sutan Sjahrir
 Sutardji Calzoum Bachri
 Sutiyoso
 Sutomo (a.k.a. Bung Tomo)
 Suzzanna

T 
 Taifib
 Talaud Islands
 Talempong
 Taliabu
 Taman Impian Jaya Ancol
 Taman Mini Indonesia Indah
 Taman Prasasti Museum
 Taming Sari
 Tan Joe Hok
 Tan Malaka
 Tanah Lot
 Tanda Kecakapan Khusus
 Tanette
 Mt Tangkuban Perahu
 Tania Gunadi
 Tanimbar Islands
 Mt Tarakan
 Tarakan
 Tarmizi Taher
 Taruma kingdom
 
 Taufik Akbar
 Taufik Hidayat
 Tause language
 Semarang Tawang Station
 Taxation in Indonesia
 Teladan Stadium
 Telkomsel
 Teluk Dalam
 Teluk Yos Sudarso
 Temenggung
 Tenggerese
 Ternate
 Tetum language
 The Coming and Spread of Islam in Southeast Asia
 The Lombok Times
 The Peak Twin Towers
 The spread of Islam in Indonesia (1200 to 1600)
 The Year of Living Dangerously
 Thiess Contractors Indonesia
 This Earth of Mankind
 Thomas Karsten
 Thousand Islands (Indonesia)
 Tidong
 Tidore
 Time in Indonesia
 Timeline of Indonesian history
 Timeline of the 2004 Indian Ocean earthquake
 Timeline of the Indonesian National Revolution (1945-1950)
 Timor
 Tiongkok
 Titi DJ
 Tjisaroea
 Tjun Tjun
 Tobelo language
 Togian Islands
 Tompaso
 Tomy Winata
 Tongkonan
 Tony Gunawan
 Topeng
 Tora Sudiro
 Toraja
 Tourism in Indonesia
 Toyol
 Trans Studio Bandung
 Trans Studio Makassar
 Trans-Sumatran Highway
 TransJakarta
 Transmigration program
 Transport in Indonesia
 Trans–New Guinea languages
 Tridadi Stadium
 Trikus Harjanto
 Trinil
 Triyatno
 Try Sutrisno
 Tsunami Evaluation Coalition
 Tuangku
 Tuanku Imam Bonjol
 Tuban
 Tugu Station (Yogyakarta)
 Tugu Stadium
 Tukul Arwana
 Tumapel
 Tunggare language

U 
 Ubud
 Ujung Kulon National Park
 Ultop
 Ulèëlheuë
 Umar Wirahadikusumah
 United Indonesia Cabinet
 Indonesian cabinet 2004-2009
 United Nations Security Council Resolution 40
 United Nations Security Council Resolution 41
 United States of Indonesia
 University of Indonesia
 Unyil
 USA for Indonesia
 Usku language
 Ussy
 Utara
 Utut Adianto

V 
 Vena Annisa
 Verawaty Fajrin (Verawaty Wiharjo)
 Villa Isola
 Village (Indonesia)
 Villages of Indonesia
 Vita Marissa

W 
 Wage Rudolf Supratman
 Waigeo
 Waingapu
 Wajo Kingdom
 Wakde
 WALHI
 Wali Sanga
 Wali Songo
 Wambon language
 War in Aceh
 Warembori language
 Waris language
 Warung
 Water supply and sanitation in Indonesia
 Wates
 Way Kambas National Park
 Wayang Windu Geothermal Power Station
 Wayang
 West Aceh Regency
 West Irian Jaya
 West Jakarta
 West Java
 West Kalimantan
 West New Guinean rupiah
 West Nusa Tenggara
 West Papuan languages
 West Sulawesi
 West Sumatra
 West Timor
 Western New Guinea
 Western Pantar language
 Wetar Strait
 Wetar
 Wetarese
 What's Up with Love?
 Whispering Sands
 Wilhelmus Zakaria Johannes
 Wilopo
 Winarni Binti Slamet
 Wiranto
 Wisma 46
 Wynne Prakusya

Y 
 Yamdena
 Yapen
 Yati Octavia
 Yawa languages
 Yayuk Basuki
 Yogyakarta (special region)
 Yos Sudarso Island
 Yuni Shara
 Yusril Ihza Mahendra

Z

See also 

 Indonesia Handbook
 International rankings of Indonesia
 List of Indonesia-related topics – the articles in this list grouped by topic
Topic outline of Indonesia

External links

 
Indonesia